Anne Michaut (born 11 November 1972 in Gray, Haute-Saône) is a French sprint canoeist.

Career
Michaut competed in the early to mid-1990s. She was eliminated in the semifinals of K-4 500 m event at the 1992 Summer Olympics in Barcelona. Four years later in Atlanta, Michaut was eliminated in the semifinals of the K-1 500 m event.

References
 Sports-Reference.com profile

1972 births
Living people
People from Gray, Haute-Saône
French female canoeists
Canoeists at the 1992 Summer Olympics
Canoeists at the 1996 Summer Olympics
Olympic canoeists of France
Sportspeople from Haute-Saône